"Be Good to Me" is a song recorded by American singer Ashley Tisdale, released in the United States on December 26, 2006 by Warner Bros. Records as the lead single from her debut studio album, Headstrong (2007). It was written by Kara DioGuardi, Joacim Persson and Niclas Molinder, and produced by Twin. Made available to the South America in January 2007, the album's version features uncredited rap vocals by Swedish musician David Jassy.

Composition and reception
The song debuted on AOL Music: First Listen on December 22, 2006. The song was featured on the album, Radio Disney Jams, Vol. 10 (2008).

The song describes relationship problems between the singer and a man; however, she wants to fix the relationship rather than end it. The song is a mid-tempo dance track that features an additional rap segment leading up to the bridge.

It is featured in the film Bring It On: In It to Win It, and in the video game Thrillville: Off the Rails, both released in 2007. On the iTunes Store, the song was released as 
a double A-Side with "He Said She Said". The song was later released as a CD single. The song is featured in the children's toothbrush, Tooth Tunes.

Music videos
The music video, directed by Chris Marrs Piliero, was shot on the set of the tour, High School Musical: The Concert (2006-2007). Tisdale's same backup dancers from the tour were used in the performance for the video. Tisdale wearing a blue sequined tank top with denim underwear shorts, runs down and dances around a blue rusted bridge, surrounded by her four backup dancers. A large screen in the background also switches between vibrant color designs. The video uses the radio edit of the song, which does not feature rap vocals by David Jassy. The video premiered as a "first look" on MTV's Total Request Live on April 19, 2007.

A new version of the video premiered on Germany's Viva on November 18, 2008. The video shows the same performance footage and home videos of Tisdale. The rap version of the song is used in the video.

Chart performance
The song debuted on the Billboard Hot 100 chart of February 17, 2007, at number 96. It rose to number 80 the following week before exiting, spending a total of two weeks on the chart. The song was released in Europe in the fall of 2008, and peaked at 67 in Austria and at number 57 in Germany.

Track listings and formats
2-track edition
 "Be Good to Me" (Radio Disney edit) – 3:14
 "Be Good to Me" – 3:33

Limited maxi edition
 "Be Good to Me" – 3:33
 "Who I Am" (non-album track) – 3:17
 "It's Life" (non-album track) – 3:47

Brazilian digital CD single
 "Be Good to Me" (Radio Disney edit) – 3:14

German maxi CD single
 "Be Good to Me" (Radio Disney edit) – 3:14
 "Last Christmas" (single version) – 3:56
 "Be Good to Me" (Jack D. Elliot Mix) – 6:17
 "Be Good to Me" (music video)

German limited CD single
 "Be Good to Me" (Radio Disney edit) – 3:14
 "Last Christmas" (single version) – 3:56

Promotional Remixes EP
 "Be Good to Me" (Eddie Baez Anthem Club) – 6:51
 "Be Good to Me" (SugarDip Club Mix) – 7:24
 "Be Good to Me" (Scalfati from T.H.C. - Scalfonzo Pop Extended Mix) – 7:31
 "Be Good to Me" (Scalfati from T.H.C. - Scalfonzo Pop Mixshow) – 5:02
 "Be Good to Me" (LSDJ from T.H.C. - Good 4 U Extended Mix) – 6:15
 "Be Good to Me" (LSDJ from T.H.C. - Good 4 U Mixshow) – 5:32

The Remixes EP
A nine-track EP was released via Warner Bros. Records on July 21, 2009, prior to the release of her second album, Guilty Pleasure. The EP, Be Good to Me: The Remixes, includes the original version of the song, seven remixes and a karaoke version. The EP is available from digital retailers.

Track listing
 "Be Good to Me" (Radio Disney edit) – 3:14
 "Be Good to Me" (Jack D. Elliot Mix) – 6:17
 "Be Good to Me" (Eddie Baez Anthem Club) – 6:51
 "Be Good to Me" (SugarDip Edit) – 5:03
 "Be Good to Me" (Scalfati from T.H.C. - Scalfonzo Pop Extended Mix) – 7:23
 "Be Good to Me" (Scalfati from T.H.C. - Scalfonzo Pop Mixshow) – 5:00
 "Be Good to Me" (LSDJ from T.H.C. - Good 4 U Extended Mix) – 6:13
 "Be Good to Me" (LSDJ from T.H.C. - Good 4 U Mixshow) – 5:26
 "Be Good to Me" (karaoke version) - 3:14

Credits and personnel
Vocals – Ashley Tisdale, David Jassy
Producer – Kara DioGuardi
Vocal producer – David Jassy
Writer(s) – Kara DioGuardi, David Jassy, Joacim Persson, Niclas Molinder, Ashley Tisdale
Mixer and additional programming – Twin
Background vocals – Kara DioGuardi

Release history

References

2006 debut singles
Ashley Tisdale songs
Dance-pop songs
Music videos directed by Chris Marrs Piliero
Songs written by Kara DioGuardi
Song recordings produced by Twin (production team)
2006 songs
Songs written by Niclas Molinder
Songs written by Joacim Persson
Warner Records singles